Tormé Meets the British is a 1957 studio album by Mel Tormé, of British songs, recorded in London.

Track listing
 "Limehouse Blues" (Philip Braham, Douglas Furber)
 "A Nightingale Sang in Berkeley Square" (Eric Maschwitz, Manning Sherwin)
 "I've Got a Lovely Bunch of Coconuts" (Fred Heatherton)
 "These Foolish Things (Remind Me of You)" (Harry Link, Holt Marvell, Jack Strachey)
 "Geordie"
 "My One and Only Highland Fling"
 "(There'll Be Bluebirds Over) The White Cliffs of Dover" (Walter Kent, Nat Burton)
 "Danny Boy" (Traditional, Frederick Weatherly)
 "Let There Be Love" (Ian Grant, Lionel Rand)
 "Greensleeves" (Traditional)
 "Try a Little Tenderness" (James Campbell, Reginald Connelly, Harry M. Woods)
 "London Pride" (Noël Coward)

Personnel

Performance
Mel Tormé - vocals
Wally Stott - arranger, conductor

References

1957 albums
Mel Tormé albums
Philips Records albums
Albums conducted by Wally Stott
Albums arranged by Wally Stott